Triyuginarayan Temple is a Hindu temple located in the Triyuginarayan village in Rudraprayag district, Uttarakhand, India. The ancient temple is dedicated to god Vishnu. Its fame is credited to the legend of god Shiva’s marriage to goddess Parvati witnessed by Vishnu at this venue and is thus a popular Hindu pilgrimage sites. A special feature of this temple is a perpetual fire, that burns in front of the temple. The flame is believed to burn from the times of the divine marriage. Thus, the temple is also known as Akhand Dhuni temple.

The temple courtyard is also the source of a water stream, which fills three sacred bathing ponds (kunds) nearby.

Etymology
The word "Triyugi Narayan" is formed of three words "tri" means three, "yugi" denotes the period of time – Yuga and "Narayan" is another name of Vishnu. Pilgrims have been offering wood to the fire in the havana-kund (fireplace) since the three Yugas – hence the place is given the name "Triyugi Narayan". Yuga in Hindu philosophy is the name of an epoch or era within a cycle of four ages. The four Yugas are Satya Yuga (1,728,000 human years), Treta Yuga (1,296,000 years), the Dvapara Yuga (864,000 years) and finally Kali Yuga (432,000 years), which is the present Yuga.

The name "Akhand Dhuni temple" also originates from the eternal flame legend, "Akhand" means perpetual and "Dhuni" means flame.

Legend

According to Hindu dharma, goddess Parvati was daughter of Himavat or Himavan – the personification of the Himalayas. She was the rebirth of Sati, the first wife of Shiva – who sacrificed her life when her father insulted Shiva. Parvati initially tried to allure Shiva by her beauty, but failed. Pilgrims visiting Triyuginaryan temple also visit the Gauri Kund temple, dedicated to Parvati, which is the base camp for trek to Kedarnath Temple. Mythology states that Shiva proposed to Parvati at Guptakashi, before they got married in the small Triyuginarayan village at the confluence of Mandakini and Sone-Ganga rivers.

Triyuginarayan is believed to be the capital of Himavat. It was the venue of the celestial marriage of Shiva and Parvati, during the Satya Yuga, witnessed in the presence of the holy fire that still burns eternally in front of the temple in a Havana-kund or Agni-kund, a four-cornered fireplace on the ground. Vishnu formalised the wedding and acted as Parvati's brother in the ceremonies, while the creator-god Brahma acted as the priest of the wedding, that was witnessed by all the sages of the times. The exact location of the wedding is marked by a stone called Brahma Shila, in front of the temple. The greatness of this place is also recorded in a sthala-purana (a scripture specific to a pilgrimage centre). According to the scripture, pilgrims who visit this temple consider the ashes from the burning fire as holy and carry it with them. It is also believed that ashes from this fire are supposed to promote conjugal bliss. Before the marriage ceremony, there were no people who witnessed the incident, the gods are believed to have taken bath in four kunds or small ponds namely, Rudra-kund, Vishnu-kund and Brahma-kund. The inflow into the three kunds is from the Saraswati-kund, which – according to legend – originated from Vishnu's navel. Hence, the water of these kunds is considered to cure infertility. The ashes from Havana-kund are supposed to promote conjugal bliss.

Structure

The Triyuginarayan temple resembles the temple of Kedarnath in architectural style and hence attracts a lot of devotees. The present shrine is also called as Akhand Dhuni temple. It is believed to have been built by Adi Shankaracharya. Adi Shankaracharya is credited with building many temples in the Uttarakhand region. The shrine houses a silver, 2-foot image of god Vishnu (Narayana), accompanied with consort – goddess of wealth Lakshmi and the goddess of music and learning – Saraswati.

In front of the temple, the havana-kund with the eternal flame - the witness of the wedding of Shiva and Parvati - is situated. Devotees add samidha (sacrificial offerings of wood) to the flame and collect the ashes as blessings. A stone called the Brahma Shila – in front of temple – is regarded as the exact spot of the divine marriage. A water stream called Saraswati Ganga originates in the courtyard of the temple. It fills all the holy ponds in the vicinity. The ponds of Rudra Kund, Vishnu Kund, Brahma Kund and Saraswati Kund are holy spots situated near the temple. Rudra Kund is for bathing, Vishnu for cleansing, Brahma for sipping and Saraswati for offering libations.

Geography
During the three winter months, the area is covered by snow.

Access
There exist a few trek routes too, like a short trek of  via Sonprayag on the Ghuttur –Kedarnath bridle path that passes through thick forest area is involved to reach the temple precincts. The nearest airport is Dehra Dun,  from Triyuginarayan, but it is better to start the journey from Delhi. Rishikesh is the nearest railway station,  from the site.

The Triyuninarayan temple is also accessed by trekking. A popular trekking or excursion route followed is from Mussoorie. The trek route followed from Mussorie, which involves 17 days of trekking, passes through Tehri, Mala (road point), Belak, Budakedar-Ghuttu-Panwali Kanta, Triyuginarayan and Kedarnath in that order. Apart from this trekking route, the Department of Tourism, Government of Uttarakhand, to encourage tourism has identified and developed six major circuits, which includes the Rudraprayag–Kedarnath circuit, covering temples at Rudraprayag, Tungnath, Okhimath, Madhyamaheshwar, Guptkashi, Triyuginarayan and Kedarnath, along the Mandakini River valley.

References

Hindu pilgrimage sites in India
Hindu temples in Uttarakhand
Vishnu temples
Rudraprayag district

External links
 Triyuginarayan Temple - Uttarakhand